Faiza Abou el-Naga is an Egyptian politician who served as minister of planning and international cooperation of Egypt during the Mubarak era and the transition period. She was appointed as Egypt's national security advisor by President Abdel Fattah El Sisi.

Career and activities
Naga was the minister of planning and international cooperation in the cabinet led by Ahmed Nazif. She retained her post in the preceding cabinets. She was a member of the National Democratic Party and served in its policy secretariat.

It was reported that Naga was the principal instigator of the action taken on 6 February 2012 to criminally charge 43 members of non-governmental organizations in Egypt with operating without required licenses, a decision which has seriously strained relations with the United States.

References

Living people
National Democratic Party (Egypt) politicians
Year of birth missing (living people)
Women government ministers of Egypt
21st-century Egyptian women politicians
21st-century Egyptian politicians
Planning ministers of Egypt
International Cooperation ministers of Egypt